Subsistence may refer ro:

 Subsistence economy, a non-monetary economy to provide for basic needs
 Travel and subsistence, expenses related to business travel
 Subsistit in, Catholic ecclesiological doctrine of Vatican II

See also
Subsistence agriculture
Subsistence crisis
Subsistence Homesteads Division, of the US Department of the Interior; a New Deal agency
Subsistence pattern or strategy, the means by which a society satisfies its basic needs for survival